Wie's Bang is Van Coke Kartel's fourth Studio album. It was Released in November 2011, and recorded at Bellville Studios near Cape Town.

Track listing

References

Van Coke Kartel albums